The Environmental Services Association (ESA) is a professional organisation in the United Kingdom representing the UK's waste and secondary resources industry. The ESA's members include the major waste management companies in the UK and is open to all organisations involved in the management of wastes.

Founded in 1968 by waste industry leaders including the following:
Tony Morgan, Purle Bros Ltd.
Don Pannell, A A Pannell Ltd.
Anthony Shutes, Hales Containers Ltd.
Malcolm Wood, Leigh Interests Ltd.
Richard Biffa, Biffa Waste Services Ltd.
Colin Drinkwater, W W Drinkwater Ltd.
Tony Smith, Waste Management Ltd.
Harold Mould, Cleansing Service Group Ltd.
Sam Hemmings, S Hemmings Bristol Ltd.

The current Director-General is Barry Dennis who is also President of the Chartered Institution of Wastes Management, the professional body for waste professionals in the UK.

References

External links
ESA Website
Environmental Cleanup Hazardous Cleanup, Industrial Cleaning

Waste organizations